The 36th Annual Tony Awards was broadcast by CBS television on June 6, 1982, from the Imperial Theatre. The host was Tony Randall.

The ceremony
Presenters: Lucie Arnaz, Milton Berle, Victor Borge, Pam Dawber, Lillian Gish, Marvin Hamlisch, Lena Horne, Beth Howland, Robert Goulet, James Earl Jones, Swoosie Kurtz, Michele Lee, Hal Linden, Ann Miller, Robert Preston, Jason Robards, Ginger Rogers, Gary Sandy, Ben Vereen.

Some of Broadway's theatres were being demolished (the Morosco, Helen Hayes and Bijou Theatres) thus the theme was to celebrate a great Broadway theatre, the Imperial. "The Imperial Medley" featured songs from Rose Marie; Oh, Kay!; Jubilee; Leave It to Me; On Your Toes; Between the Devil; Annie Get Your Gun; Miss Liberty; Call Me Madam; The Most Happy Fella; Fiddler on the Roof; The New Moon; Silk Stockings; Wish You Were Here; The Laugh Parade; Carnival; They're Playing Our Song; Oliver!; and Pippin.

Musicals represented: 
Dreamgirls ("It's All Over/And I Am Telling You I'm Not Going" - Jennifer Holliday and Company);
Joseph and the Amazing Technicolor Dreamcoat ("Any Dream Will Do" - Bill Hutton and Company); 
Nine ("Be Italian" - Kathi Moss and Company); 
Pump Boys and Dinettes (Medley - Company).

Winners and nominees
Winners are in bold

Special awards

Special Awards—The Actors' Fund of America
Theatre Award '82 
Warner Communications 
Radio City Music Hall

Regional Theatre Award -- The Guthrie Theatre, Minneapolis, Minnesota

Multiple nominations and awards

These productions had multiple nominations:

13 nominations: Dreamgirls
12 nominations: Nine
8 nominations: The Life and Adventures of Nicholas Nickleby 
7 nominations: Joseph and the Amazing Technicolor Dreamcoat  
6 nominations: Medea 
4 nominations: Crimes of the Heart
3 nominations: The First, Little Me and "Master Harold"...and the Boys 
2 nominations: Agnes of God, The Dresser, Mass Appeal, Othello and A Taste of Honey

The following productions received multiple awards.

6 wins: Dreamgirls    
5 wins: Nine
4 wins: The Life and Adventures of Nicholas Nickleby

See also
 Drama Desk Awards
 1982 Laurence Olivier Awards – equivalent awards for West End theatre productions
 Obie Award
 New York Drama Critics' Circle
 Theatre World Award
 Lucille Lortel Awards

External links
Official Site

Tony Awards ceremonies
1982 in theatre
1982 theatre awards
1982 awards in the United States
1982 in New York City